François is the French-language debut album by Desireless, released in 1989 and re-released in 2001. The single "" was a chart topper in many European and Asian single charts.

Track listing

 "" – 4:31
 "" – 4:48
 "Hari ôm Ramakrishna" – 5:11
 "" – 5:07
 " (New age mix)" – 0:36
 "" – 3:58
 "" – 4:04
 "" – 4:15
 "" – 3:48
 "John" – 4:14
 "" – 4:42
 "" – 4:22

Lyrics & music: Jean Michel Rivat
Except "" & "": Lyrics by J. M. Rivat. Music by J. M. Rivat & D. Dubois.

2001 CD re-release track listing

Label: Choice Of Music 
Catalogue number: 200 105-2

 "" - 4.24
 "John" - 4.13
 "" - 4.28
 "" - 4.14
 "" - 4.48
 "Hari ôm Ramakrishna" – 5:10
 "" – 5:08
 "" – 3:58
 "" – 4:04
 "" – 3:48
 "" - 4.41
 "Star" - 4.39
 "" (Maxi version) - 6.41
 "John" (Maxi version) - 6.27
 " (Europe remix) - 6.38

Singles

 "Qui Peut Savoir" – 1986
 "" – 1986/1987 (France #2, Germany #1, UK #5 *)
 "John" – 1988 (France #5)
 "" – 1989
 "" – 1990

*when originally released it charted at #53 but was re-released  in 1988 as a remix by P. Hammond & P. Waterman of PWL titled Britmix.

References

Official site
Discogs info

1989 debut albums
Desireless albums